De Toonzaal is a music venue for chamber music, improvised music, and experimental music, situated in Den Bosch, Netherlands in a former synagogue. The music program is mainly focused on classical music and contemporary music, less on popular music.

The synagogue was built in 1823. During World War II a row of houses was built in front of the synagogue to block the view. Forty years later these houses were taken down to give the building its old appearance in the city. After World War II until the 1970s, the synagogue became less used.

Toonzaal Studio
In October 2015 De Toonzaal opened an analog studio for education, recording and experimentation. The studio features a broad range of sound synthesis equipment (mainly made by Hewlett Packard in the 1960s) suitable to create sound and music and record this analog and digital recording. The main installation is a voltage controlled vintage measurement equipment consisting out of tone generators, noise generators, oscillators, filters, sequencers and an analog computer. The studio is connected to the concert space and can relay the live performances as well as interact with them.

CBK Toonzaalprijs 
The first this happened was in 2010 to Laura Hoek and in 2013 Shirley Welten.

References

External links
 Official website
 info site from the city of Den Bosch (in Dutch)
 Festival Theater aan de Parade about De Toonzaal
 Article in newspaper Brabants Dagblad about De Toonzaal
 Website dedicated to early music about De Toonzaal

Music venues in the Netherlands
Concert halls in the Netherlands
's-Hertogenbosch
Buildings and structures in 's-Hertogenbosch
Rijksmonuments in North Brabant